Physa is a genus of small, left-handed or sinistral, air-breathing freshwater snails, aquatic pulmonate gastropod mollusks in the subfamily Physinae of the family Physidae.

These snails eat algae, diatoms and detritus.

Anatomy 
Members of the freshwater pulmonate family Physidae possess a complex of muscles that is unique amongst gastropods. This complex was given the name "physid musculature". The physid musculature has two main components, the physid muscle sensu stricto and the fan muscle. The physid musculature is responsible for a unique ability of physids to rapidly flick their shells from side to side — a reaction that frequently enables them to escape predation.

Shell description
These small snails, like all the species in the family Physidae, have shells that are sinistral, which means that when the shell is held with the spire pointing up and the aperture facing the viewer, then the aperture is on the left-hand side.

The shells of Physa species have a long and large aperture, a pointed spire, and no operculum. The shells are thin and corneous, and rather transparent.

Species
Species in the genus include:
 
 † Physa aplexoides Yen, 1969 
 Physa arachleica Starobogatov & Prozorova, 1989
 † Physa aravanica Zharnyl'skaya, 1965 
  Physa aridi Mezzalira, 1974 - fossil from Brazil
 † Physa bacca Pan & Zhu, 2007 †
 † Physa beijiangensis W. Yü & X.-Q. Zhang, 1982 †
 † Physa boreaui Coquand, 1860 
 † Physa bullatula White, 1886 
 † Physa canadensis Whiteaves, 1885 
 † Physa carletoni Meek, 1873
 † Physa cenomanensis Repelin, 1902 
 † Physa cepedaensis Perrilliat & Vega in Perrilliat et al., 2008 
 † Physa changleensis Youluo, 1978 
 † Physa changzhouensis W. Yü, 1977 
 Physa chippevarum (Taylor, 2003)
 Physa clarkei Ingersoll, 1875
 † Physa cokevillensis Yen, 1954
 † Physa conispira Yen & Reeside, 1946 
 † Physa copei White, 1877 
 Physa dalmatina Küster, 1844
 † Physa debilula Gu in Gu & Wang, 1989 
 † Physa delecta Nicolas, 1891 †
 † Physa doeringi Doello-Jurado, 1927 
 † Physa doliolum Matheron, 1843 
 † Physa felix White, 1878 
 Physa fontinalis (Linnaeus, 1758) - Fountain bladder snail - type species
 † Physa fuxinensis X.-H. Yu, 1987 
 † Physa galei Russell, 1926 
 † Physa galloprovincialis Matheron, 1843 
 † Physa gaoyouensis W. Yü, 1977 
 † Physa gardanensis Matheron, 1843 
 † Physa globosa Yen, 1954 
 † Physa gracilis Nicolas, 1891 
 Physa hankensis Starobogatov & Prozorova, 1989
 † Physa jingangkouensis H.-Z. Pan, 1983 
 † Physa kanabensis White, 1876
 † Physa lacryma F. Sandberger, 1871 
 † Physa lacteana Russell, 1935 
 † Physa liaoxiensis X.-H. Yu, 1987 
 † Physa longiuscula Meek & Hayden, 1856 
 Physa megalochlamys Taylor, 1988 - Cloaked physa
 Physa meneghinii Sacco, 1886 †
  Physa mezzalirai Ghilardi, Carbonaro & Simone, 2011 - fossil from Brazil
 † Physa michaudii Matheron, 1843 
 † Physa micra Yen & Reeside, 1946 
 † Physa minima Repelin, 1902
 † Physa miqueli Caziot, 1905 
 Physa mirollii Taylor, 2003
 † Physa montanensis Yen, 1951 
 † Physa naucatica Zharnyl'skaya, 1965 
 † Physa nebrascensis Meek & Hayden, 1856 
 † Physa nisidai Suzuki, 1941 
 † Physa nucleus Repelin, 1902 
 † Physa obtusiconica X.-H. Yu, 1987 
 †Physa orientalis G.-X. Zhu, 1980 
 † Physa paravitimensis G.-X. Zhu, 1980 
 † Physa patula Nicolas, 1891 
 † Physa pijiagouensis X.-H. Yu, 1987
 Physa pumilia Conrad, 1834
 † Physa pygmaea Nicolas, 1891 
 †Physa rhomboidea Meek & Hayden, 1856 
 † Physa ringentis Youluo, 1978 
 † Physa saxarubrensis Russell, 1957 
 † Physa secalina Evans & Shumard, 1856 
 † Physa shakengensis W. Yü & X.-Q. Zhang, 1982 
 † Physa shandongensis H.-Z. Pan, 1983 
 † Physa shantungensis Yen, 1969 
 † Physa simeyrolsensis Repelin, 1902 
 † Physa sinensis Yen, 1969 
 Physa skinneri Taylor, 1954
 Physa streletzkajae Starobogatov & Budnikova, 1967
 † Physa subacuta Benoist, 1873 
 † Physa subcylindrica Repelin, 1902 
 Physa taslei Bourguignat, 1860
 † Physa tenuicostata H.-J. Wang, 1982 
 † Physa usitata White, 1895
 Physa vernalis Taylor et Jokinen, 1984
 † Physa walcotti Yen & Reeside, 1946 
 † Physa wealdiana Coquand, 1856 
 † Physa wichmanni Parodiz, 1961 
 † Physa zhuoxianensis Yü & Pan, 1982 
 Physa sp., Lake Winnipeg Physa, lives in Manitoba in Canada. It was classified as endangered by COSEWIC. COSEWIC recommendation has been forwarded to the Minister of the Environment of Canada and a decision for listing at the List of Wildlife Species at Risk of the Canadian Species at Risk Act was pending in 2005.

Synonyms
 Physa acuta Draparnaud, 1805, Physa heterostropha (Say, 1817), Physa integra (Haldeman, 1841) and Physa natricina Taylor, 1988 are synonyms of Physella acuta (Draparnaud, 1805)
 Physa ancillaria (Say, 1825) - Pumpkin Physa: synonym of Physella ancillaria (Say, 1825) (original combination)
 Physa carolinae Wethington, Wise & Dillon, 2009: synonym of Physella carolinae (Wethington, Wise & Dillon, 2009)
 Physa concolor Haldeman, 1841: synonym of Physella gyrina (Say, 1821)
 Physa columbiana (Hemphill, 1890) is a synonym for Physella columbiana (Hemphill, 1890)
 Physa gyrina (Say, 1821) is a synonym for Physella gyrina (Say, 1821)
 Physa hordacea (I. Lea, 1864): synonym of Physella hordacea (I. Lea, 1864)
 Physa jennessi Dall, 1919: synonym of Beringophysa jennessi (Dall, 1919)
 Physa lordi (Baird, 1863): synonym of Physella lordi (Baird, 1863)
 Physa marmorata Guilding, 1828 - synonyms: Physa mosambiquensis Clessin, 1886 and Physa waterloti: synonym of Stenophysa marmorata (Guilding, 1828)
 Physa natricina Taylor, 1988: synonym of Physella natricina (D. W. Taylor, 1988)
 Physa nuttalli I. Lea, 1864: synonym of Physella gyrina (Say, 1821)
 Physa propingua (Tryon, 1865): synonym of Physella propinqua (Tryon, 1865)
 Physa sibirica Westerlund, 1876: synonym of Sibirenauta sibirica (Westerlund, 1876)

References 

 Janus, Horst, 1965. ‘’The young specialist looks at land and freshwater molluscs’’, Burke, London

External links 
 http://www.animalbase.uni-goettingen.de/zooweb/servlet/AnimalBase/list/species?taxongenus=301
 Dillon R. T., Wethington A. R. & Lydeard C. (2011). "The evolution of reproductive isolation in a simultaneous hermaphrodite, the freshwater snail Physa". BMC Evolutionary Biology 11: 144. .

Physidae